Kronprinsessegade 36 is a Neoclassical property overlooking Rosenborg Castle Garden in central Copenhagen, Denmark. A plaque embedded in the wall between the first and second floor commemorates that the composer Christoph Ernst Friedrich Weyse lived in the building from 1825 to 1842.

History
 
Kronprinsessegade 36 was built by master builder Thomas Blom in 1820–1825. Blom had until then lived at Kronprinsessegade 40 but this family moved into one of the apartment when the new building on its completion in 1825.  Thomas Blom lived in the building until his death in 1841 and It was sold by his widow in 1845. One of the other apartments in the new building was taken over by composer and organist Christoph Ernst Friedrich Weyse. He had lived at No. 8 since 1915. He lived in the apartment until his death in 1842. 

The mathematician and politician Carl Christoffer Georg Andræ lived in the building from 1843 to 1846.

Count W. C. E. von Sponneck, a jurist, lived in the building from 1845 to 1863. He was appointed to Minister of Financial Affairs in 1849. Carl Emil Fenger (1814-1884), director of the Royal Veterinary and Agricultural College, lived in the building from 1870.

Architecture
 
 
The building consists of three storeys over a high cellar. The roof is a Mansard roof with a two-bay wall dormer flanked by two dormers. A cornice supported by brackets runs under the roof.

A side wing extends from the rear side of the building. A four-storey warehouse is located at the bottom of the courtyard.

References

External links

Listed residential buildings in Copenhagen
Thomas Blom buildings
Residential buildings completed in 1825
Commemorative plaques in Copenhagen
1825 establishments in Denmark